Phyllodoce is a genus of polychaete worms, which contains about 200 species. The prostomium bears eyes, two pairs of antennae and a pair of large retractile nuchal organs. The eversible proboscis is clearly divided into two parts.

Species
The World Register of Marine Species includes the following species in the genus :

Phyllodoce adarensis Benham, 1927
Phyllodoce agassizi Nolte, 1938
Phyllodoce albovittata Grube, 1860
Phyllodoce algerensis Nolte, 1938
Phyllodoce arenae Webster, 1879
Phyllodoce armigera (Blake, 1988)
Phyllodoce australis Day, 1975
Phyllodoce basalis (Hartmann-Schröder, 1965)
Phyllodoce benedenii (Hansen, 1882)
Phyllodoce berrisfordi (Hartmann-Schröder, 1974)
Phyllodoce bimaculata Saint-Joseph, 1898
Phyllodoce breviremis Quatrefages, 1866
Phyllodoce bruneoviridis Saint-Joseph, 1898
Phyllodoce bulbosa Wesenberg-Lund, 1962
Phyllodoce callaona Grube, 1857
Phyllodoce canariensis Nolte, 1938
Phyllodoce capreensis Nolte, 1938
Phyllodoce catenula Verrill, 1873
Phyllodoce chalybeia Grube, 1880
Phyllodoce chinensis Uschakov & Wu, 1959
Phyllodoce citrina Malmgren, 1865
Phyllodoce clava Carrington, 1865
Phyllodoce colmani Day, 1949
Phyllodoce cordifolia Johnston, 1865
Phyllodoce cortezi (Kudenov, 1975)
Phyllodoce costata Grube, 1850
Phyllodoce cuspidata McCammon & Montagne, 1979
Phyllodoce digueti Fauvel, 1943
Phyllodoce dissotyla Willey, 1905
Phyllodoce diversiantennata (Hartmann-Schröder, 1986)
Phyllodoce dubia (Fauchald, 1972)
Phyllodoce duplex McIntosh, 1885
Phyllodoce elongata (Imajima, 1967)
Phyllodoce erythraeensis Gravier, 1900
Phyllodoce erythraensis Gravier, 1900
Phyllodoce erythrophylla (Schmarda, 1861)
Phyllodoce fakaravana Chamberlin, 1919
Phyllodoce faroensis Nolte, 1938
Phyllodoce ferruginea Moore, 1909
Phyllodoce flavescens Grube, 1857
Phyllodoce foliosopapillata Willey, 1905
Phyllodoce fristedti Bergström, 1916
Phyllodoce geoffroyi Audouin & Milne Edwards, 1833
Phyllodoce gravida Gravier, 1900
Phyllodoce griffithsii Johnston, 1865
Phyllodoce groenlandica Örsted, 1842
Phyllodoce hartmanae Blake & Walton, 1977
Phyllodoce hawaiia (Hartman, 1966)
Phyllodoce helderensis Nolte, 1938
Phyllodoce helgolandica Nolte, 1938
Phyllodoce heterocirrus (Chamberlin, 1919)
Phyllodoce hiatti Hartman, 1966
Phyllodoce impostii Audouin & Milne Edwards in Quatrefages, 1866
Phyllodoce incisa Örsted, 1842
Phyllodoce japonica Imajima, 1967
Phyllodoce jeffreysii (McIntosh, 1908)
Phyllodoce koreana (Lee & Jae, 1985)
Phyllodoce lamelligera (Gmelin in Linnaeus, 1788)
Phyllodoce laminosa Savigny in Lamarck, 1818
Phyllodoce latifrons Hartmann-Schröder, 1960
Phyllodoce lineata (Claparède, 1870)
Phyllodoce longicirris Grube, 1857
Phyllodoce longifrons Ben-Eliahu, 1972
Phyllodoce longipes Kinberg, 1866
Phyllodoce macrolepidota Schmarda, 1861
Phyllodoce macropapillosa Saint-Joseph, 1895
Phyllodoce macrophthalmos Grube, 1857
Phyllodoce maculata (Linnaeus, 1767)
Phyllodoce madeirensis Langerhans, 1880
Phyllodoce magnaoculata Treadwell, 1901
Phyllodoce malmgreni Gravier, 1900
Phyllodoce marquesensis Monro, 1939
Phyllodoce medipapillata Moore, 1909
Phyllodoce megareme Quatrefages, 1844
Phyllodoce melaena Monro, 1939
Phyllodoce mernoensis Knox, 1960
Phyllodoce minuta (Treadwell, 1937)
Phyllodoce modesta Quatrefages, 1866
Phyllodoce monroi (Hartman, 1964)
Phyllodoce mucosa Örsted, 1843
Phyllodoce multicirris Grube, 1878
Phyllodoce multipapillata (Kravitz & Jones, 1979)
Phyllodoce multiseriata Rioja, 1941
Phyllodoce nana Saint-Joseph, 1906
Phyllodoce neapolitana Nolte, 1938
Phyllodoce nicoyensis Treadwell, 1928
Phyllodoce noronhensis Nolte, 1938
Phyllodoce novaehollandiae Kinberg, 1866
Phyllodoce oerstedii Quatrefages, 1866
Phyllodoce panamensis Treadwell, 1917
Phyllodoce papillosa Uschakov & Wu, 1959
Phyllodoce parva (Hartmann-Schröder, 1965)
Phyllodoce parvula Gravier, 1907
Phyllodoce patagonica (Kinberg, 1866)
Phyllodoce pellucida Quatrefages, 1844
Phyllodoce pettiboneae Blake, 1988
Phyllodoce ponticensis Nolte, 1938
Phyllodoce pseudopatagonica Augener, 1922
Phyllodoce pseudoseriata Hartmann-Schröder, 1959
Phyllodoce pulla Treadwell, 1926
Phyllodoce punctata Schmarda, 1861
Phyllodoce puntarenae Grube, 1857
Phyllodoce quadraticeps Grube, 1878
Phyllodoce rathkei Quatrefages, 1866
Phyllodoce rosea (McIntosh, 1877)
Phyllodoce salicifolia Augener, 1913
Phyllodoce sanctaevincentis McIntosh, 1885
Phyllodoce sanctijosephi Gravier, 1900
Phyllodoce schmardaei Day, 1963
Phyllodoce stigmata Treadwell, 1925
Phyllodoce tahitiensis Monro, 1939
Phyllodoce tenera Grube, 1878
Phyllodoce tenuissima Grube, 1878
Phyllodoce tergestinensis Nolte, 1938
Phyllodoce tortugae Treadwell, 1917
Phyllodoce transatlantica Blanchard in Gay, 1849
Phyllodoce truncata (Hartmann-Schröder, 1965)
Phyllodoce tuberculosa Kudenov, 1975
Phyllodoce tubicola Day, 1963
Phyllodoce undata Pruvot, 1883
Phyllodoce varia Treadwell, 1928
Phyllodoce variabilis (Hartmann-Schröder, 1965)
Phyllodoce violacea Treadwell, 1926
Phyllodoce williamsi (Hartman, 1936)

References
 
 

Polychaete genera
Taxa named by Jean-Baptiste Lamarck